Juwan Thompson (born May 13, 1992) is a former American football running back who played college football at Duke. He was signed by the Denver Broncos as an undrafted free agent in 2014.

College career
Thompson played college football at Duke University from 2010 to 2013. He finished his career with 1,244 rushing yards on 274 carries and had nine touchdowns.

Professional career
Thompson was signed by the Denver Broncos after going undrafted in the 2014 NFL Draft.

In a game against the Arizona Cardinals, Thompson scored his first career touchdown on an 8-yard run. In a Thursday Night Football game against division rival San Diego Chargers, Thompson ran for two touchdowns as the Broncos went on to win 35–21.

On February 7, 2016, Thompson was part of the Broncos team that won Super Bowl 50. In the game, the Broncos defeated the Carolina Panthers by a score of 24–10.
Thompson was inactive for the game.

On September 3, 2016, Thompson was waived by the Broncos. The next day, he was signed to the Broncos' practice squad. He was promoted to the active roster on October 29, 2016 after starting running back C. J. Anderson was placed on injured reserve.

On September 2, 2017, Thompson was waived by the Broncos.

References

External links
Denver Broncos bio
Duke Blue Devils bio

1992 births
Living people
People from Fairburn, Georgia
People from Saint Croix, U.S. Virgin Islands
Players of American football from Georgia (U.S. state)
Sportspeople from Fulton County, Georgia
United States Virgin Islands players of American football
American football running backs
Duke Blue Devils football players
Denver Broncos players
Salt Lake Stallions players
Woodward Academy alumni